Pom Pom Squad is an American indie rock/grunge band from Brooklyn, New York. It is the solo project of frontwoman Mia Berrin, and features permanent members Shelby Keller (drums) and Alex Mercuri (guitar).

History 
Mia Berrin was raised in Orlando, Florida and began Pom Pom Squad when she was eighteen years old. She soon moved to New York City to attend New York University,where she performed solo under the name Pom Pom Squad and with an early iteration of the band, with whom she released the EP Hate It Here in 2017. Berrin is of African-American and Puerto Rican descent and identifies as queer. She is outspoken about the influence her identity has on her music.

Berrin later met bassist Mari Alé Figeman and drummer Shelby Keller at club show and reformed the band. Guitar duties fluctuated between Ethan Sass and Alex Mercuri for a period until Mercuri became the permanent fourth member. Pom Pom Squad released their EP Ow in September 2019. The band built critical buzz during this time and were booked for multiple SXSW showcases as well as supporting tour dates with The Front Bottoms and Disq; these dates in 2020 were ultimately cancelled due to the COVID-19 pandemic. During 2020, Pom Pom Squad released a series of covers and the original single "Red with Love."

On March 2, 2021, it was announced that Pom Pom Squad had signed with the Berlin independent label City Slang. With the announcement, the band released the single "Lux." They announced their first full-length album Death of a Cheerleader and shared single "Head Cheerleader" in April, followed by third and final single "Crying". Death of a Cheerleader was released on June 25, 2021.

The band released the single "Until It Stops" in November 2021 as part of Spotify's Fresh Finds program. In December 2021, the band released a cover of Nada Surf's hit "Popular," featuring their vocalist/guitarist Matthew Caws on backing vocals. The accompanying video replicated Nada Surf's 1996 video shot for shot, with Berrin playing each of the major characters. Pom Pom Squad's video was filmed at the same location as the original video.

In 2022, Pom Pom Squad toured alongside Illuminati Hotties and Fenne Lily before embarking on the Death of a Cheerleader tour.  They performed as the opening act for PUP and Bartees Strange. Their song "Shame Reactions" was featured on the soundtrack for the teen comedy film “Do Revenge”.

Members 

 Mia Berrin – lead vocals, guitar 
 Shelby Keller – drums 
 Alex Mercuri  – guitar 
Touring members
 Lauren Marquez 
 Alina Sloan – bass 
 Camellia Hartman – violin, backing vocals 
Former members
 Ethan Sass – guitar 

 Mari Alé Figeman – bass

Discography 

Adapted from Bandcamp.

Studio albums 

Death of a Cheerleader (2021)

EPs 

 Hate It Here (2018)
 Ow (2019)

Singles 
"Popular"(Nada Surf cover)(2021)
"Until It Stops"(2021)
 "Crying" (2021)
 "Head Cheerleader" (2021)
 "Lux" (2021)
 "Hello Santa Claus" (2020)
 "Crimson + Clover" (Tommy James and the Shondells cover) (2020)
 "Red with Love" (2020)
 "Cellophane" (FKA Twigs cover) (2020)
 "Cherry Blossom" (2019)
 "Honeysuckle" (2019)
 "Heavy Heavy" (2019)
 "Hate It Here" (2018)

References 

Musical groups from Brooklyn
Riot grrrl bands
American alternative rock groups